Nauru Olympic Committee (IOC code: NRU) is the National Olympic Committee representing Nauru. It represents and organises the Olympic movement on the island. The NNOC was founded in 1991 and was recognised by the International Olympic Committee in 1994. It is also the body responsible for Nauru's representation at the Commonwealth Games.

Nauru has participated regularly in the Olympic Games since 1992. So far, the NNOC has sent seven athletes to the Olympic Games:

 Marcus Stephen (1992-2000), first Nauruan Olympian
 Quincy Detenamo (1996)
 Gerard Garabwan (1996)
 Sheeva Peo (2000), first Nauruan woman Olympian
 Reanna Solomon (2004)
 Itte Detenamo (2004, 2008)
 Yukio Peter (2004)

See also
Nauru at the Olympics
Nauru at the Commonwealth Games

References

External links
 Official website
 Nauru Olympic Committee

Nauru
Nauru
Sports governing bodies in Nauru
Nauru at the Olympics
1991 establishments in Nauru
Sports organizations established in 1991